The 44th edition of the annual Hypo-Meeting took place on May 26 and May 27, 2018 in Götzis, Austria. The track and field competition, featuring a men's decathlon and a women's heptathlon event is part of the 2018 IAAF Combined Events Challenge.

Men's decathlon

Schedule 

May 26

May 27

Records

Results

Women's heptathlon

Schedule 

May 26

May 27

Records

Results

References 

 Results
 Men's Event by Event Decathlon Scores
 Women's Event by Event Heptathlon Scores

External links
Home page

2018
Hypo-Meeting
Hypo-Meeting
Hypo-Meeting